William Chetwynd may refer to:
 William Chetwynd (MP for Wootton Bassett) (c. 1691–1744), British lawyer and politician
 William Chetwynd, 3rd Viscount Chetwynd (1684–1770), British politician, MP for Stafford, and for Plymouth
 William Richard Chetwynd (c. 1731–1765), English aristocrat and politician, MP for Stafford
 William Henry Chetwynd (1811–1890), involved in a sensational divorce case in 1865